Baleia may refer to:

In Brazil:
Baleia State Park, a protected area in Minas Gerais
In Cape Verde:
Achada Baleia, a settlement on the island of Santiago
Baleia (São Vicente), a valley on the island of São Vicente
In Portugal:
Atouguia da Baleia, a parish in the municipality of Peniche
In Romania:
Baleia, tributary of the Jiul de Vest in Hunedoara County
Baleia River (Murgușa), tributary of the Murgușa in Hunedoara County
In São Tomé and Príncipe:
Ponta Baleia, a headland in southern São Tomé